Carmen Tórtola Valencia (June 18, 1882 – February 13, 1955) was a Spanish early modern dancer, choreographer, costume designer, and painter, who  generally performed barefoot. Tórtola Valencia is said to have been the inspiration for Rubén Darío's poem, La bailarina de los pies desnudos ("The Barefoot Dancer").

Biography

Born in Seville to a Catalan father (Florenç Tórtola Ferrer, d. 1891) and Andalusian mother (Georgina Valencia Valenzuela, d. 1894), she was three years old when her family emigrated to London. In his book Tortola Valencia and Her Times (1982), Odelot Sobrac, one of her early biographers, said Tórtola Valencia developed a style that expressed emotion through movement and that she was inspired by Isadora Duncan. A member of Generación del 13, her costumes are part of the collection of Centre de Documentació i Museu de les Arts Escèniques. Her Spanish modernismo style enabled a career as a solo concert dance artist who performed classic, Oriental, and Spanish pieces. She made her debut at the Gaiety Theatre in London (1908), appearing at the Berlin Wintergarten theatre and the Folies Bergère of Paris in the same year. She performed in Nuremberg and London in 1909. One of the people she taught was the Anglo-Indian dancer Olive Craddock aka Roshanara. In 1911, she made her Spanish debut at the Romea Theatre of Madrid. She was at the Ateneo de Madrid in 1913.

The feminist
Tórtola Valencia was also a "pioneer Spanish feminist of the 20th century". Being gay and having leftist ideas, Tórtola Valencia was jailed at the end of the Spanish Civil War. In 1928, she met Magret Angeles-Vila and they were inseparable thereafter. She danced for the last time in 1930 in Quito. She began painting in Barcelona where she died in 1955 and is buried at Poblenou Cemetery.

Papers and possessions 
Tórtola's collection of musical scores is preserved in the Biblioteca de Catalunya. 

Her personal papers and dress collection are preserved in the Centre de Documentació i Museu de les Arts Escèniques in Barcelona.

References

Carlota Caulfield, "Carmen Tortola Valencia (1882 - 1955)", Corner, Vol. 2 (Spring 1999).
María Pilar Queralt del Hierro, Tortola Valencia, a woman in the shadows, Barcelona, Editorial Lumen, 2005.

Further reading

External links

 Musical Scores Collection of Tórtola Valencia in the Biblioteca de Catalunya

1882 births
1955 deaths
People from Seville
Spanish female dancers
Lesbian dancers
Lesbian painters
Spanish choreographers
Spanish feminists
Spanish vedettes
Modern dancers
Spanish LGBT entertainers
Spanish LGBT painters
Spanish lesbian artists
Spanish people of Catalan descent
Burials at Poblenou Cemetery